Aldo Palazzeschi (2 February 1885 – 17 August 1974) was the pen name of Aldo Giurlani, an Italian novelist, poet, journalist and essayist.

Biography
He was born in Florence to a well-off, bourgeois family. Following his father's direction, he studied accounting but gave up that pursuit as he became enamoured with the theatre and acting. Respectful of his father's wishes that the family name not be associated with acting, he chose his maternal grandmother's maiden name Palazzeschi as a pseudonym.

His family's comfortable circumstances enabled him to publish his first book of poetry, I cavalli bianchi (The White Horses) in 1905 using his acting pseudonym.

After meeting Filippo Tommaso Marinetti, he became a fervent Futurist. However, he was never entirely ideologically aligned with the movement and had a falling out with the group over Italy's involvement in World War I which he opposed, even though he did spend a brief period at the front lines after having been inducted into the military in 1916. His "futurist period" (roughly the 1910s) was a very fecund time in which he published a series of works that cemented his reputation. Most notable of these is his novel Il codice di Perelà (translated into English as Man of Smoke) published in 1911. Marinetti used to give away more copies of the Futurist books he published than those he sold, and Palazzeschi later recalled that in 1909, so many copies of one of his books were given away that even he failed to secure a copy.

During the interwar years, his poetical production decreased, as he became involved in journalism and other pursuits. He took no part in the official culture of the Fascist regime, but he found himself working in various magazines that did.

In the late sixties and early seventies, he started publishing again, with a series of novels that resecured his place in the new, post-war avant-garde. He died in 1974 in his apartment in Rome.

Legacy
Today he is often considered an important influence on later Italian writers, especially those of the neoavanguardia in both prose and verse. His work is well noted by its "grotesque and fantastic elements".

French composer Pascal Dusapin composed the opera Perelà, uomo di fumo (premiered 2003), which is based on the novel by Palazzeschi.

Published works

 I cavalli bianchi (1905)
 Lanterna (1907)
 Poemi (1909)
 L'incendiario (1910)
 Il codice di Perelà (1911)
 Il controdolore (1914)
 Due imperi... mancati (1920)
 L'interrogatorio della contessa Maria (1925)
 La piramide (1926)
 Stampe dell'Ottocento (1932)
 Sorelle Materassi (1934)
 Il palio dei buffi (1936)
 Allegoria di novembre (1943)
 Difetti 1905 (1947)
 I fratelli Cuccoli (1948)
 Bestie del '900 (1951)
 Roma (1953)
 Scherzi di gioventù (1956)
 Il buffo integrale (1966)
 Il doge (1967)
 Cuor mio (1968)
 Stefanino (1969)
 Storia di un'amicizia (1971)
 Via delle cento stelle (1972)

References

External links

Centro di Studi Aldo Palazzeschi. 

1885 births
1974 deaths
Writers from Florence
Italian writers in French
20th-century Italian novelists
20th-century Italian male writers
Italian poets
Italian male poets
Futurist writers
Italian Futurism
Italian military personnel of World War I
Viareggio Prize winners
Italian male novelists